Johnny Lee Davis (born July 17, 1956) is a retired American football running back who played ten seasons in the NFL (1978–1987).  Davis was a member of the 1981 San Francisco 49ers team that won Super Bowl XVI. He is a graduate of Sidney Lanier High School in Montgomery, Alabama, and the University of Alabama in Tuscaloosa.

High school career

Davis was a team captain as a senior at Sidney Lanier High School in Montgomery, Alabama. He was a four-year letter winner for coach Bill Joiner as a running back and linebacker. He also made the Coach and Athlete magazine High School All-America Team in 1973, the Birmingham News First-team All-State 1973, All-Class 4A 1973, All-City 1973, and was named Mr. Back in Montgomery.  He rushed for 1,152 yards on 250 carries with six touchdowns as a senior. In the AHSAA North-South All-Star Game in 1974, he was named the Most Valuable Back. He also earned five letters in track, competing in discus and shot put.

College career (1974–1978)

Davis played for the University of Alabama under coach Paul W. "Bear" Bryant and is one of the legendary "wishbone fullbacks". He lettered three of the four years of his college career. On November 23, 1977, Coach Bryant called him "the best fullback I've ever coached" in The Tuscaloosa News. Nicknamed "Bull", Davis led the Crimson Tide in rushing in three of his four seasons at Alabama, and he ranked third all-time at Alabama with 2,519 career rushing yards on 447 attempts, 5.64 average yards per carry, and 21 touchdowns. He was a member of the 2nd Team All-SEC 1975, 2nd Team All-SEC 1976, 2nd Team UPI All-America Team 1977, 1st Team All-SEC 1977, and Alabama Team of the Decade 1970s. He was also named to the 1977 Churchmen Hall of Fame All-America Team, which honors players for on-field performance and church work off the field. Davis was ABC-TV and Chevrolet Most Outstanding Offensive Player of the Game vs. Auburn in 1975 when he rushed for 98 yards on 18 carries, the Dixie Howell Memorial Award Winner at the 1975 Spring A-Day Game, and ABC-TV and Chevrolet Most Outstanding Offensive Player of the Game vs. LSU in 1977 when he rushed for 126 yards on 23 carries. He competed in the Orange Bowl, Liberty Bowl, and two Sugar Bowls. As a senior, Davis was the top rusher in inaugural match-up vs. Ohio State, with 95 yards on 24 rushing attempts while leading the Crimson Tide to a 38–6 win over the Buckeyes in the 1978 Sugar Bowl. He was invited to the 1978 Senior Bowl and named the South's Most Outstanding Offensive Player, leading the South with 109 rushing yards on 23 carries and scoring a touchdown. While at Alabama, Davis and Ozzie Newsome were roommates throughout their college careers and remain best friends to this day. Davis is a member of Omega Psi Phi Fraternity.

Alabama school records

Among Alabama school records, Davis ranks ninth in career rushing with 2,519 yards, and is the only fullback in the top ten of all-time rushers, ranking fourth with a career average of 5.64 yards per carry, for those with a minimum of 400 attempts. Davis ranks third all-time with a 6.67 yards per carry single-season average, for those with a minimum of 100 attempts, achieved in the 1975 season. He led his team in rushing three consecutive years (1975–1977) and is tied for seventh with seven career 100-yard rushing performances. He holds the record for most 100-yard rushing performances by a fullback with seven. He achieved the longest run from scrimmage in the 1975 season (66-yard TD vs. TCU) and in the 1976 season (58-yard TD vs. LSU). He also achieved the most rushing yards in a single game in the 1975 season (155 yards vs. Washington) and the 1977 season (153 yards vs. Vanderbilt).

Alabama statistical highlights

 1974–100 rushing yards, 23 attempts, 4.3 average 
 1975–820 rushing yards (5th in SEC), 123 attempts, 6.7 average, 7 TDs
 1976–668 rushing yards (9th in SEC), 119 attempts, 5.6 average, 7 TDs
 1977–931 rushing yards (2nd in SEC), 182 attempts, 5.1 average, 5 TDs
 Four career receptions for 80 yards or more
 Best statistics for an individual game – vs. Washington 1975, 155 yards rushing on 13 carries and 3 rushing TDs (31 yards, 51 yards, 6 yards)
 2,599 total career yards from scrimmage, 451 plays, 5.8 yards per play, 19 TDs
 SEC Champions 1974, 1975, 1977
 Alabama 1974–1977 W–L record 42–6

Professional career highlights
Davis was drafted in round two of the 1978 NFL draft, 30th overall, by The Tampa Bay Buccaneers. As a blocking fullback for the Tampa Bay Buccaneers, Davis opened holes for tailback Ricky Bell's best rushing season in 1979, helping his team win the NFC Central Division. He played in the 1980 NFC Championship Game with the Tampa Bay Buccaneers.

In 1981, Davis played for the San Francisco 49ers, where he won a Super Bowl XVI ring. Nicknamed "Goal Line", he averaged a touchdown every 13 times he carried the ball for the 49ers. Davis was the first African-American player from the University of Alabama to win a Super Bowl, winning Super Bowl XVI in 1981 with the San Francisco 49ers. He was their third leading scorer and third best rusher, scoring a season total of 42 points on 7 TDs. He played in all 19 games; five as the starter, and rushed twice for five yards in the Super Bowl. He scored a TD in the 1982 NFC Championship Game, in which the 49ers defeated the Dallas Cowboys.

In 1982, he signed with the Cleveland Browns and played alongside his college roommate and best friend Ozzie Newsome. While with the Browns, he was nicknamed the "B1 Bomber". He received the "Captain's Award" in 1984, an honor voted by his teammates as the individual representing the essence of being a Cleveland Browns player. He played in the 1986 AFC Championship Game with the Cleveland Browns. He earned two game balls for special teams play with the Cleveland Browns. He was described in the Cleveland Browns media guide by those who knew him as "unselfish, hard-working and always smiling. B-1 is a powerful blocker and an excellent kickoff coverage man." He retired from the NFL in 1988 after ten years. He was a tough inside runner and considered one of the best blocking fullbacks in NFL history. He played in 119 regular season games, started 32, and had 1,200 yards from scrimmage, 15 rushing touchdowns, 1,094 rushing yards on 314 rushing attempts for 3.5 average yards per carry, along with 22 receptions and 106 receiving yards in his career.

Head coaches
 Paul W. Bryant – Alabama
 John McKay – Tampa Bay Buccaneers
 Bill Walsh – San Francisco 49ers
 Sam Rutigliano – Cleveland Browns
 Marty Schottenheimer – Cleveland Browns

Post-football

Davis worked as an advertising sales manager for 20 years. He  is a retired  educator, is a motivational speaker and conducts football camps for kids. In addition, Davis is an accomplished professional jazz and gospel pianist. He currently shares a home in an undisclosed location with his longtime soulmate Constance. They have shared a friendship since their college days in Tuscaloosa and reunited when their paths crossed later in life.

He is a life member of Omega Si Phi Fraternity.

See also
 Alabama Crimson Tide football yearly statistical leaders

References

1956 births
Living people
American football running backs
Alabama Crimson Tide football players
University of Alabama alumni
Tampa Bay Buccaneers players
San Francisco 49ers players
Cleveland Browns players
Players of American football from Montgomery, Alabama